The United States Army Logistics University (ALU), a subordinate school of the United States Army Combined Arms Support Command, is located at Fort Lee, Virginia.

The Army Logistics University (ALU) officially opened its doors on 2 July 2009, as part of the 2005 Base Realignment and Closure Law. The ALU received its genesis from the Army Logistics Management College (ALMC). 

While it is a self-titled "University", Army Logistics University received accreditation status from the Council on Occupational Education (COE), recognized by the U.S. Department of Education.

The Army Logistics University contains the Logistics Leaders College, providing military officer's logistics training.  The college offers key functions courses including; Basic Officer Leader Course for Quartermaster, Ordnance, and Transportation Lieutenants, Logistics Captains Career Course for Captains, and key functional courses such as the Support Operations Course and pre-command courses to prepare Lieutenant Colonels and Colonels for command of logistics formations.

See also
LOGNet

References

External links
 Official web site

Educational institutions established in 2009
Military logistics of the United States
Buildings and structures in Prince George County, Virginia
United States Army schools
Education in Prince George County, Virginia
Universities and colleges accredited by the Council on Occupational Education
2009 establishments in Virginia